The , shown on some maps as Moro Heritage, is an archaeological site where stone tools from the Paleolithic Age (between 3.3 million years ago and  11,650 cal BP) were found in Itabashi Ward, Tokyo, Japan.

History 

In March 1951, a junior high school student called  (who would later become an archaeologist) passing through the area found obsidian stone tools and clusters of pebbles on a cross-sectional part of a road that cut through a hill called . A joint excavation was conducted by Meiji University and Musashino Museum in July of the same year. This was the second survey on the Paleolithic Age in Japan after a study of the Iwajuku archaeological site in Gunma Prefecture. It became clear that Paleolithic culture, which is older than that from the Jōmon period, had spread universally in Japan. The archaeological site was designated as a historic site of Tokyo in 1969, and as a historic site of Itabashi Ward in 1984. The 22 excavated stone tools were also designated as tangible cultural properties of Tokyo in 1999.

Location 
The site is in Jōhoku-Chūō Park in Tokyo, but it is not accessible so as to protect the wooded area in the site. A stone column and information boards show the site’s location.

References 

Itabashi City Office’s webpage about the site

External links 
Webpage about research near Shakujii River
Tokyo Metropolitan Government's webpage

Archaeological sites in Japan
Historic Sites of Japan
Paleolithic sites in Japan